Tunnel Springs is an unincorporated community in Monroe County, Alabama, United States.  It has one site listed on the Alabama Register of Landmarks and Heritage, the Old Scotland Presbyterian Church.

History
A post office called Tunnel Springs was established in 1902, and remained in operation until it was discontinued in 1973. An old railroad tunnel accounts for the name.

Geography

References

Unincorporated communities in Alabama
Unincorporated communities in Monroe County, Alabama